The Charmer (Italian: Rubacuori) is a 1931 Italian comedy film directed by Guido Brignone and starring Armando Falconi, Tina Lattanzi and Ada Dondini. It is part of the White Telephone genre of films. It was shot at the Cines Studios in Rome.

Cast
 Armando Falconi as Il banchiere Giovanni Marchi 
 Tina Lattanzi as La signora Marchi, moglie di Giovanni 
 Ada Dondini as La signora Marchi, madre di Giovanni 
 Mary Kid as Ilka Bender 
 Grazia del Rio as Dolly 
 Vasco Creti as L'allenatore sportivo 
 Mercedes Brignone as Giulietta Dupré 
 Alfredo Martinelli as Il complice di Dolly 
 Guido Celano as Un cliente del night club 
 Egon Stief as Joe Battling 
 Vittorio Bianchi as Il vicecommissario 
 Giorgio Bianchi as Il commissario 
 Maria Della Lunga Mandarelli
 Giacomo Moschini 
 Roberto Pasetti 
 Mario Revera

References

Bibliography 
 Reich, Jacqueline & Garofalo, Piero. Re-viewing Fascism: Italian Cinema, 1922-1943. Indiana University Press, 2002.

External links 

1931 films
Italian comedy films
Italian black-and-white films
1931 comedy films
1930s Italian-language films
Films directed by Guido Brignone
Cines Studios films
1930s Italian films